Patrick Videira (born 26 April 1977) is a French football manager who manages Furiani-Agliani.

Career

In 1996, Videira signed for Chaves in the Portuguese top flight from the reserves of PSG, one of France's most successful clubs.

In 2000, he signed for Ermesinde in the Portuguese third division from Portuguese second division side Maia.

In 2004, Videira signed for Rodez in the French fourth division, where he survived a plane crash on the way to a game against Bastia.

In 2014, he signed for French sixth division team Côte Bleue.

References

External links
 

French people of Portuguese descent
Living people
Primeira Liga players
Expatriate footballers in Portugal
French expatriate sportspeople in Portugal
French football managers
Association football midfielders
1977 births
F.C. Maia players
Ermesinde S.C. players
G.D. Chaves players
FC Martigues players
Ligue 2 players
Rodez AF players
AS Cannes players
Nîmes Olympique players
Championnat National 2 players
Championnat National 3 players
Championnat National players
French footballers